History Decoded: The 10 Greatest Conspiracies of All Time is a 2013 non-fiction book by Brad Meltzer. It contains a series of investigations into history’s greatest conspiracies. Contained in at the introduction to each chapter is an envelope that holds facsimiles of relevant evidence: John Wilkes Booth's alleged unsigned will, a map of the Vatican, John F. Kennedy's death certificate. It is a companion to the show Brad Meltzer's Decoded on History Channel. According to WorldCat, the book is in 896 libraries.

Contents 
The book contains investigation into the following mysteries:
"John Wilkes Booth : Was Lincoln's Assassin Apprehended?"
"Confederate Gold : Stolen Treasure or Hidden Wealth of a New Confederacy?"
"The Georgia Guidestones : America's Stonehenge"
"DB Cooper : American Outlaw"
"The White House : Where is the Cornerstone of Democracy?"
"The Spear of Destiny : History's Most Sacred Relic"
"The Real Da Vinci Code : Did Leonardo Predict an Apocalypse?"
"Is there any Gold in Fort Knox?"
"UFOs : Inside Roswell and Area 51"
"The Kennedy Assassination : the Truth is out There."

References

External links 
  - Brad Meltzer

2013 non-fiction books
Books about conspiracy theories
Books by Brad Meltzer
Workman Publishing Company books